Paradmete cryptomara is a species of sea snail, a marine gastropod mollusk in the family Volutomitridae.

Description
The length of the shell attains 16.3 mm.

Distribution
This marine species is found off Cape Horn.

References

External links
 Rochebrune A.T. de & Mabille J. (1885). Diagnoses de mollusques nouveaux, recueillis par les membres de la mission du Cap Horn et M. Lebrun, Préparateur au Muséum, chargé d'une mission à Santa-Cruz de Patagonie. Bulletin de la Société Philomathique de Paris. (7) 9(3): 100-111
 Di Luca, J. & Zelaya, D. G. (2019). Gastropods from the Burdwood Bank (southwestern Atlantic): an overview of species diversity. Zootaxa. 4544(1): 41-78

Volutomitridae
Gastropods described in 1885